Zeatrophon is a genus of sea snails, marine gastropod mollusks in the family Muricidae, the murex snails or rock snails.

Species
Species within the genus Zeatrophon include:
 Zeatrophon ambiguus (Philippi, 1844)
 † Zeatrophon bonneti (Cossmann, 1903) 
 Zeatrophon huttoni (R. Murdoch, 1900)
 † Zeatrophon lassus (Marwick, 1928) 
 Zeatrophon mortenseni (Odhner, 1924)
 Zeatrophon pulcherrimus Finlay, 1930
Species brought into synonymy
 Zeatrophon caudatinus Finlay, 1930: synonym of Xymene mortenseni (Odhner, 1924): synonym of Zeatrophon mortenseni (Odhner, 1924)
 Zeatrophon elegans Fleming, 1943: synonym of Zeatrophon ambiguus (Philippi, 1844)
 Zeatrophon murrayae C. A. Fleming, 1943: synonym of † Zeatrophon lassus (Marwick, 1928) †
 † Zeatrophon mutabilis Marwick, 1928: synonym of Zeatrophon ambiguus (Philippi, 1844)
 Zeatrophon tmetus Finlay, 1930: synonym of Xymene huttonii (Murdoch, 1900)

References

External links

Pagodulinae